{{Speciesbox
| image = 
| image_caption = 
| taxon = Bosara brevipecten
| authority = Holloway, 1997<ref>{{cite web |last=Yu |first=Dicky Sick Ki |date=1997–2012 |url=http://www.taxapad.com/local.php?taxonidLC=82842946 |title=Bosara Walker 1866 |website=Home of Ichneumonoidea |publisher=Taxapad |archive-url=https://web.archive.org/web/20170813231140/http://www.taxapad.com/local.php?taxonidLC=82842946 |archive-date=August 13, 2017}}</ref>
| synonyms = 
}}Bosara brevipecten'' is a moth in the family Geometridae. It is found on Borneo and Seram. The habitat consists of montane forests.

The length of the forewings is 7 mm.

References

Moths described in 1997
Eupitheciini
Moths of Indonesia